Publika FM is a Romanian language radio station in Chişinău, the Republic of Moldova.

See also
 Publika TV

References

External links
 Publika

Romanian-language radio stations in Moldova
Mass media in Chișinău